Ragnar Fredrik Bergstedt (10 July 1889 – 22 October 1987) was a Swedish rower who competed in the 1912 Summer Olympics. He was a crew member of the Swedish boat Göteborgs that was eliminated in the first round of the men's eight tournament.

References

1889 births
1987 deaths
Swedish male rowers
Olympic rowers of Sweden
Rowers at the 1912 Summer Olympics
People from Säffle Municipality
Sportspeople from Värmland County